Aretha Sings the Blues is a compilation album of previously released Aretha Franklin recordings from Aretha's early 1960s tenure with Columbia Records.

Track listing

From the albums

Unforgettable: A Tribute to Dinah Washington (1964): Tracks 1, 3, 11–13
Aretha: With The Ray Bryant Combo (1960): Tracks 2, 14
Yeah!!! (1965): Tracks 4–6
Soft and Beautiful (1964): Track 7
Laughing on the Outside (1963): Tracks 8, 9
Soul Sister (1966): Track 10

References

External links 

Aretha Franklin compilation albums
1980 compilation albums
Columbia Records compilation albums
Blues compilation albums